That is Pandu is 2005 Telugu-language romantic comedy film, produced by M L Kumara Chowdhary on Sri Keerthi Creations banner and directed by Devi Prasad. Starring Jagapathi Babu, Sneha  and music composed by Mani Sharma. The film recorded as Average at the box office.

Plot
The film begins with Anjali a TV anchor & a classical dancer whose aim is to triumph the trophy in National Dance Festivals. Pandu a jack of all trades resides in a colony where diverse mindsets of people stay together and he is beloved by him. Once, Pandu witnesses the generosity of Anjali adores her ideologies, and turns into her hardcore fan. Therefrom, he behind her as White on Rice as an admiration which pesters her and misconstrues him as a scapegrace. Meanwhile, Home Minister Bhagawan a scandalous malice one-time invited as Chief Guest to Anjali’s concert where he lecherous her. Bhagawan confesses and terror-stricken her when she spits on him. Hence, Bhagawan's acts of vengeance incriminate Anjali in drug trafficking case through her friends Rahul & Shilpa. Moreover, no one gets for her succor except Pandu as he is aware of Anjali’s righteousness. 

Right now, he schemes intellectually, sends his friend Sudari a petty thief into prison, and seeks out the actuality. Thus, enraged Pandu challenges Bhagawan to prove Anjali not guilty. Firstly, he acquits her on parole utilizing his wit when she discerns his code of behavior and starts liking him. The next, Pandu targets Bhagawan who needles, loathes the fame, and makes his life futile. Parallelly, Anjali is selected for the competitions but she shows apathy. Here, Pandu boosts her courage and prepares for finals. Eventually, he acquits Anjali as innocent, brings out the diabolic shade of Bhagawan, and dethrones him. So, infamed Bhagawan attacks Anjali while she is proceeding to contest and breaks her leg. Pandu rescues her, ceases Bhagawan, and successfully takes Anjali to the auditorium. At that point, Anjali stands up by the willpower given by Pandu and acquires the victory. At last, Anjali proclaims on stage that her entire success is acknowledged at Pandu's feet and proposes to him. Finally, the movie ends on a happy note with the marriage of Pandu & Anjali.

Cast

 Jagapati Babu as Pandu
 Sneha as Anjali
 Madhu Sharma as Sundari
 Sayaji Shinde as Bhagawan
 Dharmavarapu Subrahmanyam as Bhagawan's brother-in-law
 M. S. Narayana as Watch Vaaliswara Rao
 Kondavalasa as Anjaneyulu 
 Krishna Bhagavaan as Harishchandra
 Raghu Babu as Lawyer
 Venu Madhav as Sunnunda
 Prudhviraj as Police inspector
 Radha Kumari as Pandu's grand mother
 Gundu Hanumantha Rao as Psychiatrist
 Gundu Sudharshan as Musician
 Fish Venkat as Bhagawan's henchman
 Sameer as Rahul 
 Jyothi as Shilpa
 Hema Sundar as CM
 Chandra Mouli as Courier Boy
 Kallu Krishna Rao
 Meesala 
 Junior Relangi

Soundtrack

Music composed by Mani Sharma. Music released on ADITYA Music Company.

Reception
Indiaglitz wrote that:
"Jagapati Babu as usual did a neat job. He displayed the much required prowess in his role as a stubborn man who does not care for any risk.

Sneha's performance comes as an asset to the movie. Unlike routine heroines, she holds a meaningful footage in the movie and the story revolves round her. Her climax dance is superb.

Madhu Sharma's supporting role is convincing, though has certain extra scenes.

Sayaji Shinde as villain is impressive. His elevation from a juvenile criminal to a street rowdy to a politician comes as a satire. Showing him as a ruthless villain with good taste for painting and music has some variety.

Venu Madhav steals the show with his comedy. Kondavalasa's role as one who is addicted to "Yoga Asanams" is hilarious. Dharmavarapu acted as brother-in-law to the villain and comes out with his typical witty role, equally supported by Krishna Bhagwan as lawyer.

Story was straight and simple without any flashbacks, but somehow traditional. Screenplay was equally balanced in the first and second halves, with little boredom. Director Devi Prasad does not disappoint the audiences and at the same there is nothing much to speak about the direction.

Songs were above average and music by Mani Sharma passed off unnoticed, but for thumping beats at the climax. Stunts by Ram Lakshman were applauded. Comedy was good and served as good support to the movie".

References

2005 films
2000s Telugu-language films
Films scored by Mani Sharma
2005 romantic comedy films
Indian romantic comedy films